Mihalis Dafermos (Greek: Μιχάλης Δαφέρμος; born October 1976) is a Greek mathematician. He is Professor of Mathematics at Princeton University and holds the Lowndean Chair of Astronomy and Geometry at the University of Cambridge.

He studied mathematics at Harvard University and was awarded a BA in 1997. His PhD thesis titled Stability and Instability of the Cauchy Horizon for the Spherically Symmetric Einstein-Maxwell-Scalar Field Equations was written under the supervision of Demetrios Christodoulou at Princeton University.

He has won the Adams Prize writing on the subject Differential Equations in 2004 and the Whitehead Prize in 2009 for "his work on the rigorous analysis of hyperbolic partial differential equations in general relativity." In 2015 he was elected as a fellow of the American Mathematical Society.

References

External links
 Homepage at Cambridge

Living people
20th-century Greek mathematicians
21st-century Greek mathematicians
Cambridge mathematicians
Whitehead Prize winners
Fellows of the American Mathematical Society
Harvard College alumni
1976 births
Princeton University alumni
Lowndean Professors of Astronomy and Geometry